Palaeomephitis steinheimensis is an extinct species of mephitid of the Miocene epoch in Europe. It is the earliest known species of the family Mephitidae.

Description
Palaeomephitis steinheimensis was described by Jäger in 1839 from a well-preserved cranium found in Steinheim am Albuch in Baden-Württemberg, southern Germany. Subsequently, different authors considered it to represent a viverrid or a leptarctine mustelid. It was placed in the Mephitinae (now considered to be a distinct family) by Wolsan in 1999, on the evidence of its having an extended epitympanic recess to the middle ear.

Taxonomy

Within the skunks, Palaeomephitis is considered to stand close to the two extant species of stink badger (Mydaus) and the several extinct species of Promephitis. This clade is considered to be a sister group to all other skunks living today and other fossil forms.

References

Mephitidae
Prehistoric carnivoran genera